Victoria Leonie (Pat) Byrnes (maiden name Palazzi) (2 April 1888 – 12 May 1964), teacher and school inspector. In 1956, long financially independent, she was installed as the honorary 'Mistress of Method' to the novices' teacher-training schools at Lochinvar and Singleton convents.

Also known as
Byrnes, Pat (1888–1964)
Byrnes, Victoria Leonie (1888–1964)
Palazzi, Victoria Leonie (1888–1964)
Palazzi, V. L. (Victoria Leonie) (1888–1964)

Personal life
Born near Wagga Wagga, New South Wales, third daughter and tenth of eleven children of Swiss-born parents Jean-Baptiste Palazzi, railway-ganger, and his wife Assunta, née Delponte. Miss Palazzi was married to John Joseph Byrnes and lived in Newcastle for many years; in later times she resided in Fairlight Street, Manly.

Legacy and impact
Palazzi joined the Department of Public Instruction in July 1907 as a pupil-teacher at Enmore Public School, Sydney, and completed training in 1909. While teaching (1910–15) in primary schools, she attended (part-time) the University of Sydney (B.A., 1913) and in 1916–19 taught in turn at Goulburn and at St George Girls' high schools.

In 1936 she edited The Roma Poetry Book, a much-reprinted anthology for school children which is still available in New South Wales State Library and University of Sydney library today.

References

1888 births
1964 deaths
Australian schoolteachers
University of Sydney alumni
Australian people of Swiss descent
People from Wagga Wagga